is a passenger railway station located in the village of Nishiawakura, Aida District, Okayama Prefecture, Japan. It is operated by the third-sector semi-public railway operator Chizu Express.

Lines
Awakura-Onsen Station is served by the Chizu Express Chizu Line and is 40.6 kilometers from the terminus of the line at

Station layout
The station consists of one island platform located on an embankment, with the station building connected by stairs. Platform 2 is only used when exchanging trains and waiting for passing trains. The station is unattended.

Adjacent stations

|-
!colspan=5|Chizu Express

History
Awakura-Onsen Station opened on December 3, 1994 with the opening of the Chizu Line.

Passenger statistics
In fiscal 2018, the station was used by an average of 5 passengers daily.

Surrounding area
Awakura Hot Spring
Japan National Route 373l

See also
List of railway stations in Japan

References

External links 

 Official home page 

Railway stations in Japan opened in 1994
Railway stations in Okayama Prefecture